The 2021 Mississippi State Bulldogs baseball team represented Mississippi State University in the 2021 NCAA Division I baseball season. The Bulldogs played their home games at Dudy Noble Field, Polk–DeMent Stadium. Mississippi State won the 2021 College World Series (CWS) Championship over Vanderbilt giving the Bulldogs their first team national championship in any team sport.

Preseason

SEC Coaches poll

The SEC coaches poll was released on February 11, 2021 with Mississippi State predicted to finish second in the Western Division, receiving three out of fourteen Western Division first place votes. Mississippi State also received one overall conference first place vote. Florida received twelve overall conference first place  votes and Vanderbilt also received one.

Preseason All-SEC teams

First Team
OF: Tanner Allen

Second Team
1B: Josh Hatcher
OF: Rowdey Jordan

Schedule and results

1. State Farm College Baseball Showdown originally scheduled 2/19-21 was pushed back 1 day due to winter storms in Texas.
 2. Game versus Jacksonville State was called after 5 innings due to inclement weather.
 † Largest Super Regional Crowd in NCAA History
Schedule Source:
*Rankings are based on the team's current ranking in the D1Baseball poll.

Starkville Regional

Starkville Super Regional

College World Series

Record vs. conference opponents

Rankings

MLB Draft

†Tanner Allen, a red shirt junior, was previously drafted in the 34th round in 2019.
NOTE: Houston Harding, a red shirt Junior LHP, signed a contract with the Los Angeles Angels as an undrafted free agent.
 All drafted have signed contracts.

Player Eligibility
The following players have used up their eligibility and will not return for the next season: Scotty Dubrule 2nd, Carlisle Koestler RHP, and Riley Self RHP.

High School Recruits
Before any draftees are signed by their major league team, Mississippi State was ranked 9th in the nation by Perfect Game. Perfect Game ranks players nationwide as the top 500. If there is no ranking, then the player was not in the top 500. If draft is not indicated, then the player was not drafted in this years draft. After all players, that were going to, have signed contracts with their major league team, this recruiting class is ranked 16th in the nation.

NOTE: All drafted have signed contracts.

Notes

References

Mississippi State
Mississippi State Bulldogs baseball seasons
Mississippi State Bulldogs baseball
Mississippi State
College World Series seasons
NCAA Division I Baseball Championship seasons